Charat Singhwala is a village in the Punjab province of Pakistan. It is part of Sahiwal District, and is located at 30°40'0N 73°41'55E with an altitude of 166 metres (547 feet).

References

Populated places in Sahiwal District